Tao Jin (陶金 22 January 1916 - 28 September 1986) was a popular Chinese actor of the 1940s and 1950s.

References

External links
Filmography

Chinese male film actors
1916 births
1986 deaths
20th-century Chinese male actors
Male actors from Suzhou
Chinese filmmakers
Chinese film directors
Film directors from Jiangsu